Hengdong County is a county located in the east of Hengyang prefecture-level city, Hunan province, China. It was established from the eastern part of Hengshan County in 1966 and named after the east of Mount Heng. The county of Hengdong has two townships and 15 towns under its jurisdiction, its seat is Mishui Town.

Geography
Hengdong County is located in the south of Hunan Province, between the Hengyang Basin and the Yanqi Basin in the middle reaches of the Xiang River.  It borders You County to the east, the counties of Anren and Hengnan to the south, counties of Hengshan and Hengnan to the west, and counties of Xiangtan and Zhuzhou to the north.

Hengdong is named after its location that the county is located in the east of Mount Heng.

Subdivision

15 towns
 Bailian
 Caoshi
 Dapu
 Ganxi
 Gaohu
 Mishui
 Pengyuan
 Rongheng
 Sanzhang
 Shiwan
 Wuji
 Xialiu
 Xintang
 Yanglin
 Yangqiao

2 townships
 Nanwan
 Shitan

Climate

External links
 Official Website (Chinese / 中文)

References

 
County-level divisions of Hunan
Hengyang